Eukaryotic translation initiation factor 2 subunit 3 (eIF2γ) is a protein that in humans is encoded by the EIF2S3 gene.

Function

Eukaryotic translation initiation factor 2 (eIF2) functions in the early steps of protein synthesis by forming a ternary complex with GTP and initiator tRNA and binding to a 40S ribosomal subunit. eIF2 is composed of three subunits, alpha (α), beta (β), and gamma (γ, this article), with the protein encoded by this gene representing the gamma subunit.

See also
 eIF2

References

Further reading